Stepan Vasilievich Shagaida (real name Stepan  Shagardin; January 9, 1896 in the village Belogolovy (now Ternopil region, Ukraine) – January 12, 1938 in Kharkiv) was a Ukrainian Soviet theater and film actor.

Biography 
He served in the Red Army from 1920 until 1922. His stage career began during the years of the Russian Civil War in the regimental Drama Theatre of the 45th Infantry Division.

In 1922, he studied at the Drama Studio theater  Berezil (now Kharkiv Taras Shevchenko Ukrainian Academic Drama Theatre). He began acting in films in 1924. In 1928, he became an actor of the Odessa and Kiev studios. He appeared in the films of Les Kurbas and Alexander Dovzhenko (The writer and director of Aerograd (1935)).

In the summer of 1928, he left the theater to work in cinema.  In 1927-1930, at the Odesa Film Studio, he starred in the films A Child from the Forest, The Gem of the Seven-Sided Stone, Walking in the Way, The Museum Guard, The Digging Ground, I Give You a Gift, and Five Brides. In 1930, he played the lead role in the historical drama Karmelyuk, which Lopatinsky began staging at the Odesa studio and completed at the Kyiv Film Factory. Together with Shagaid's film crew, he moved to Kyiv, where he continued to work for the next few years.  

At the end of 1937 he was arrested along with many Ukrainian film makers and shot in early 1938.

Selected filmography 
 1924 - Vendetta as Deacon   Gordiy Svyatoptitsyn
1926 - Vasya reformer as Mitya Kutsy 
1931 - Karmelyuk as Karmelyuk
 1932 - Ivan as Ivan's father
 1935 - Aerograd as Stepan Glushak
 1937 - Rich Bride as hairdresser Sidor Vasilyevich Balaba

References

External links
 

1896 births
1938 deaths
Soviet male actors
20th-century Ukrainian male actors
Ukrainian male film actors
Ukrainian male stage actors
People executed by the Soviet Union